The Assistant to the President for Homeland Security and Counterterrorism, commonly referred to as the Homeland Security Advisor and formerly the Deputy National Security Advisor for Homeland Security and Counterterrorism, is a senior aide in the National Security Council, based in the West Wing of the White House, who serves as principal advisor to the President of the United States on homeland security and counterterrorism issues.

The Homeland Security Advisor is also a statutory member of the United States Homeland Security Council. Serving at the pleasure of the President, the Homeland Security Advisor does not require Senate confirmation for appointment to the office.

History 
In the immediate aftermath of the September 11 attacks, President George W. Bush announced the creation of the interim Office of Homeland Security as a cabinet-level office in a speech to a joint session of Congress. He appointed Tom Ridge as its first Director. The Homeland Security Council was formally created on October 5, 2001, replacing the Office of Homeland Security.

Under the George W. Bush administration, the Homeland Security Advisor was independent of the National Security Council, residing within the Homeland Security Council. Under the Obama administration, while the Homeland Security Council remained, the Advisor held the title of Deputy National Security Advisor for Homeland Security and Counterterrorism, subordinating the position to the National Security Advisor.

At the start of the Trump administration, the position of Homeland Security Advisor, occupied by Tom Bossert, was elevated to the rank of Assistant to the President, making it equal in rank to the National Security Advisor. However, after clashes with the National Security Advisor, John Bolton, the position returned to the rank of Deputy Assistant to the President and was subordinate to the National Security Advisor.

List of Homeland Security Advisors

See also 
Executive Office of the President

References 

Assistants to the President of the United States